Indirana beddomii, Beddome's leaping frog, Beddome's Indian frog, or simply Beddome's frog, is a species of frog found in the Western Ghats. They are usually detected by their long leaps as they flush from the ground when disturbed. The species is named after the naturalist Richard Henry Beddome.

Description 
Vomerine teeth in two oblique groups are found just behind the level of the choanae. A free, pointed papilla is on the middle of the tongue. The head is moderate, and the snout is obtuse, with an obtuse canthus rostralis and a concave loreal region. The nostril is a little nearer to the end of the snout than to the eye; the interorbital space is as broad as the upper eyelid, or a little narrower; the tympanum is distinct, two-thirds of the diameter of the eye. The front toes are moderate, with the first extending slightly beyond the second; the hind toes are two-thirds webbed, with the web reaching the disks of the third and fifth toes; the tips of the toes are dilated into well-developed disks; the subarticular tubercles are well developed. A single, small, oval inner metatarsal tubercle is present, with no tarsal fold.   The tibiotarsal articulation reaches the tip of the snout or a little beyond. The skin of the back has short longitudinal glandular folds, with a strong fold from the eye to the shoulder. Their color is brown above, with rather indistinct darker spots; rarely, they are uniform pinkish, sometimes with a light vertebral band; a dark cross-band occurs between the eyes; a black band is found along the canthus rostralis, and a black temporal spot is seen. Its limbs are more or less distinctly cross-barred; the lower parts are uniformly whitish. Males are without vocal sacs.  Their length from snout to vent is about 2.5 in.

Distribution and habitat
This species is found in the forests of the Western Ghats, generally on the ground in moist deciduous and evergreen forests.

References

External links

beddomii
Frogs of India
Endemic fauna of the Western Ghats
Fauna of Maharashtra
Amphibians described in 1876
Taxa named by Albert Günther